Live in Paris Zenith '88 is the second live album by Jamaican reggae singer Burning Spear, released in 1988.

It was nominated for a Grammy Award for Best Reggae Album at the 32nd Grammy Awards in 1992.

Track listing
"Spear Burning"
"We Are Going"
"The Youth"
"New Experience"
"African Postman"
"Happy Day"
"Woman I Love You"
"Queen of The Mountain"
"Creation Rebel"
"Mistress Music"
"Built This City"
"The Wilderness"
"Driver"
"Door Peep" (only on double CD and vinyl)

Content of 2CD Reissue in 2003

CD1 :
"Spear Burning"
"We Are Going"
"The Youth"
"New Experience"
"African Postman"
"Happy Day"
"Woman I Love You"
"Travelling"

CD2 :
"Queen of The Mountain"
"Creation Rebel"
"Mistress Music"
"Built This City"
"The Wilderness"
"Driver"
"Door Peep"
"Old Marcus Garvey"
"Swell Headed"

Credits
All songs written by Winston Rodney
Executive Producer – Blue Moon Productions
Recorded in digital at the Zenith on May 19, 1990 with Mobile Studio Le Voyageur (Paris)
Sound engineer – Andrzej (Andy) Gierus
Assistant engineers – Rene Weiss, Pierre Allesandri and Jonathan Dee
Mixed on 48 digital track at Marcus Studio Recording, London by Winston Rodney and Nelson Miller
Assistant Engineer – Jonathan Dee
Mastered by Tom Baker at Future Disc Systems, Hollywood, CA
Art concept and design – Jon Sellers and Virginia Hodge
Art work – Compodesign, Paris
Photos by Jean-Bernard Sohiez
This LP is dedicated to Florence
Love Always To All Burning Spear Fans
Thanks to Eric Greenspan, Winston Rodney and Nelson Miller for their trust and to Garance Production, Le Voyageur, Jeremy Jones (Marcus Studio Recording), Vu a la Tele, Duran Production, Dennis Bovell, Andy, Pascal Soalhat, Blue Moon Music and all the Burning Band.

Musicians
Winston Rodney – lead vocal and percussion
Nelson Miller – drums
Devon Bradshaw – bass
Anthony Bradshaw – guitar
Lenford Richards – lead Guitar
Alvin Haughton – percussion
Pamela Fleming – trumpet
Jennifer Hill – saxophone
Nilda Richards – trombone
Richard Anthony Johnson – synthesizer and keyboard

1989 live albums
Burning Spear live albums
Slash Records live albums